Charles Preston Wickham (September 15, 1836 – March 18, 1925) was a 19th-century congressman and judge from Norwalk, Huron County, Ohio.

Biography 
Wickham attended the public schools, the Norwalk Academy, and the Cincinnati Law School.  He was admitted to the bar in 1858 and practiced in Norwalk, Ohio.

Civil War 
During the American Civil War, he enlisted as a private in Company D, Fifty-fifth Regiment, Ohio Volunteers, in September 1861 and rose to the rank of lieutenant colonel by brevet.  He was mustered out of the service July 11, 1865, and resumed the practice of law in Norwalk.

He served as prosecuting attorney 1866-1870 and was elected judge of the court of common pleas of the fourth judicial district in 1880 and 1885.  Wickham was then elected as a Republican to the Fiftieth and Fifty-first Congresses (March 4, 1887 – March 3, 1891) and served as chairman of the Committee on Coinage, Weights, and Measures (Fifty-first Congress).  He died in Norwalk, Ohio on March 18, 1925, after being struck by a car and was interred in Woodlawn Cemetery.

References
 Biographical Directory of the United States Congress, 1771–Present

External links

Ohio state court judges
Ohio lawyers
Union Army officers
People from Norwalk, Ohio
1836 births
1925 deaths
University of Cincinnati College of Law alumni
County district attorneys in Ohio
People of Ohio in the American Civil War
Road incident deaths in Ohio
Pedestrian road incident deaths
19th-century American lawyers
Republican Party members of the United States House of Representatives from Ohio